Batuque may refer to:
 Batuque (game), a game once played in Brazil
 Batuque (music and dance), a music and dance genre from Cape Verde
 Batuque (religion), an Afro-American religion in Southern Brazil
 Batuque FC, a Cape Verdean football (soccer) club
Batuque, the Soul of a People, a 2006 Cape Verdean documentary film